Rekibuddin Ahmed is an Indian National Congress politician from Assam. He was elected in Assam Legislative Assembly election in 2011, 2016 and 2021 from Chaygaon constituency.

References 

Indian National Congress politicians from Assam
Living people
Politicians from Guwahati
Assam MLAs 2011–2016
Assam MLAs 2016–2021
Assam MLAs 2021–2026
Year of birth missing (living people)